Dinesh Chandra Joarder (5 August 1928 – 14 September 2018) was an Indian politician who was a member of Communist Party of India. He was a member of both Lok Sabha and Vidhan Sabha.

Early life
Joarder, son of Jagdish Chander Joarder, was born in Nimbari village in Malda district on 5 August 1928. An advocate by profession, he was educated at A.C. Institute, Malda, Malda College, Malda, Surendranath Law College, Kolkata, and University of Calcutta. He married Dipali Joarder in 1960 and they had a son.

Political career
In 1971, he defeated Uma Roy the sitting MP of Congress to win from Malda (Lok Sabha constituency). In 1977, he defeated the Congress candidate Pranab Mukherjee in the same constituency. He lost to A. B. A. Ghani Khan Choudhury of Congress, however, in 1980. In 1987 and 1991, he won from Kaliachak (Vidhan Sabha constituency).

He was an active political and social worker and was associated with the peasant and trade union movements. He was the president or secretary of many organisations in Malda district. He was a commissioner of the English Bazar municipality from 1964 to 1968.

Later life and death
He was suffering from old age problems for some time and died at his residence in Malda on 14 September 2018. He leaves behind his wife Dipali and son Kaushik.

References 

1928 births
2018 deaths
West Bengal MLAs 1987–1991
West Bengal MLAs 1991–1996
People from Malda district
Lok Sabha members from West Bengal
Communist Party of India (Marxist) politicians from West Bengal
University of Calcutta alumni
India MPs 1971–1977
India MPs 1977–1979